David Kennedy may refer to:

Arts and entertainment
David Kennedy (actor) (born 1964), British actor
David Kennedy (born 1988), British musician performing as Pearson Sound
David Kennedy (film producer) (1941–2015), American film producer
David Kennedy (singer) (1825–1886), Scottish minister and tenor
David J. Kennedy (painter) (1816/17–1898), Philadelphia painter
David Michael Kennedy (born 1950), American fine art photographer

Politicians and government
David Kennedy (Australian politician) (born 1940), politician and member of the Australian House of Representatives
David B. Kennedy, member of the Wyoming House of Representatives
David Kennedy (economist) (born 1969), British civil servant, formerly chief executive of the Committee on Climate Change
David J. Kennedy (politician) (1907–1995), Maine politician and pharmacist
David M. Kennedy (politician) (1905–1996), American businessman, economist and United States Secretary of the Treasury
David T. Kennedy (1934–2014), American politician, mayor of Miami

Science and academics
David Kennedy (astronomer) (1864–1936), first New Zealand born Marist priest, noted astronomer and educator
David Kennedy (jurist) (born 1954), American legal academic, vice president of international affairs at Brown University
David L. Kennedy (born 1948), Scottish Roman archaeologist and historian at the University of Western Australia and the University of Oxford
David M. Kennedy (historian) (born 1941), Pulitzer Prize-winning historian and professor at Stanford
David M. Kennedy (criminologist) (born 1958), American criminologist, author of Don't Shoot

Sports
David Kennedy (hurler) (born 1976), Irish hurler
David Kennedy (racing driver) (born 1953), Irish racing driver
Dave Kennedy (footballer) (born 1949), English footballer
David Kennedy (cricketer) (1890–1916), Scottish cricketer and soldier

Other
David Kennedy (advertising) (1939–2021), American advertising executive, co-founder of the Wieden+Kennedy agency
David Kennedy, 1st Earl of Cassilis (aft. 1463–1513), Scottish peer
David Kennedy, 10th Earl of Cassilis (bef. 1734–1792), Scottish peer
David A. Kennedy (1955–1984), fourth of eleven children of Robert F. Kennedy
David S. Kennedy (1791–1853), Scottish-American merchant and banker